Thornton is a census-designated place in the town of Richmond, Shawano County, Wisconsin, United States. Its population was 65 as of the 2010 census.

History
The community was named after Thornton, New Hampshire.

References

Census-designated places in Shawano County, Wisconsin
Census-designated places in Wisconsin